Melitopol  is an air base of the Ukrainian Air Force located near Melitopol, Zaporizhzhia Oblast, Ukraine.

The base is home to the 25th Transport Aviation Brigade flying Ilyushin Il-76M/MD, Ilyushin Il-78 and Antonov An-26 aircraft.

The base was captured by Russian forces on 1 March 2022 during the 2022 Russian invasion of Ukraine. On 3 July it was hit by Ukrainian rocket strikes.

References

Ukrainian airbases
Melitopol